Biswajit Chatterjee (born 14 December 1936), known mononymously as Biswajit, is an Indian actor, producer, director, singer and politician known for his work in Hindi and Bengali cinema.

Early career 
After films in Calcutta including Mayamrigo (1960) and Dui Bhai (1961), Biswajit relocated to Bombay. In 1962, he performed in the film Bees Saal Baad, which was followed by Kohraa, Bin Badal Barsat, Majboor, Kaise Kahoon, and Paisa Ya Pyaar.

His filmography includes Mere Sanam (1965), Shehnai, Aasra (1964), Night in London, Yeh Raat Phir Naa Aaygi (1966), April Fool (1964), Kismat (1968), Do Kaliyan (1968), Ishq Par Zor Nahin and Sharaarat (1972). He was usually paired with notable actresses such as Asha Parekh, Waheeda Rehman, Mumtaz, Mala Sinha and Rajshree.

Biswajit appeared in Rekha's debut film Anjana Safar (1969) (later re-titled Do Shikaari). Though Anjana Safar was blocked by the censors and not released until 10 years later, a scene from the film which shows him kissing Rekha appeared on the pages of the Asian edition of Life magazine. Rekha had complained that during the filming of one of the romantic scenes, Biswajit unexpectedly kissed her for 5 minutes against her will, and the entire crew started cheering and whistling while she was in tears.

Between acting in Bollywood movies, Biswajit has returned to Calcutta to act in Bengali films, including Chowringhee (1968) and Garh Nasimpur with Uttam Kumar and Kuheli and much later, Srimaan Prithviraj (1973), Jai Baba Taraknath (1977) and  Amar Geeti  (1983).

Apart from acting, Biswajeet also sings and performs in concerts. In the 1970s, he cut a disc of two Bengali modern numbers Tomar Chokher Kajole and Jay Jay Din, both composed by Salil Choudhury.

Later career 
In 1975, Biswajit produced and directed his own film, Kahte Hai Mujhko Raja. The film besides him starred Dharmendra, Hema Malini, Shatrughan Sinha, and Rekha. He had done one film Anjana Safar with Rekha previously. R.D. Burman composed the music. Later, he went back to acting. He will make a film on Netaji Subash Chandra Bose's life (in Hindi, English and Bengali) and will act in a new untitled Hindi film (murder mystery) with his younger daughter actress Prima Chatterjee. He has also acted in a Hindi Stage Play, Ulta Seedha, produced directed written by wife Ira Chatterjee. In the play, he acted with his daughter Prima.

Political career
In the 2014 general elections, Biswajit contested from New Delhi as an All India Trinamool Congress candidate. He finished 7th, securing only 909 votes.

In 2019, he joined Bharatiya Janata Party.

Personal life
Biswajit has a son and a daughter by his first wife, the late Ratna Chatterjee. His son Prosenjit and elder daughter Pallavi Chatterjee are also actors in the Bengali Film Industry. Biswajit lives in Mumbai with his second wife, Ira Chatterjee who is producer, director, writer of stage plays and is owner of Dream Theatre. Their younger daughter, Prima Chatterjee is a film actress, theatre actress and a dance performer.

Filmography

Kangsa (as Lord Krishna) (1958)
Daak Harkaraa (1959)
Natun Fasal (1960)
Badhu (as the younger brother of Basanta Chaudhuri) (1962)
Maya Mriga (1960)
Kathin Maya (1961)
Dui Bhai (1961)
Nav Diganta (1962)
Sesh Paryanta
Dhoop Chhaya (1962)
Dada Thakur (1962)
Bees Saal Baad (1962)
Bin Badal Barsaat (1963)
Shehnai (1964)
Prabhater Rang (1964)
Majboor (1964)
Kohra (1964)
Kaise Kahoon (1964)
Godhuli Belaye (1964)
April Fool (1964)
Mere Sanam (1965)
Do Dil (1965)
Yeh Raat Phir Na Aayegi (1966)
Sagaai (1966)
Biwi Aur Makan (1966)
Aasra (1966) .... Amar Kumar
Night in London (1967) .... Jeevan
Nai Roshni (1967) .... Prakash
Jaal (1967)
Hare Kanch Ki Chooriyan (1967)
Ghar Ka Chirag (1967)
Vaasna (1968)
Kismat (1968)
Kahin Din Kahin Raat(1968)
Do Kaliyaan (1968)
Chowringhee (1968)
Monihaar
Tamanna (1969)
Raahgir (1969)
Pyar Ka Sapna (1969)
Paisa Ya Pyaar (1969)
Pardesi (1970)
Ishq Par Zor Nahin (1970)
Garh Nasimpur
Main Sunder Hoon (1971)
Raktakto Bangla (1972) (Bangladesh-India joint production film)
Shararat (1972)
Chaitali (1972)
Kuheli (1971)
Main Sundar Hoon (1971)
Sriman Prithviraj (1973)
Mehmaan (1973)
Ami Sirajer Begam (1973)
Raktatilak (1974)
Prantarekha (1974)
Do Aankhen (1974)
Phir Kab Milogi (1974)
Kahte Hain Mujhko Raja (1975) (Also director of the film)
Bajrangbali (1976)
Naami Chor (1977)
Baba Taraknath (1977)
Do Shikaari (1979)
Hum kadam (1980)
Amar Geeti (1983)
Anand Aur Anand (1984)
Saaheb (1985)
Harishchandra Shaibya (1985)
Krishna-Krishna (1986)
Allah Rakha (1986)
Sadak Chhap (1987)
Belagaam (1988)
Zimmedaaar (1990)
Jigarwala (1991)
Kaun Kare Kurbanie (1991)
Mehboob Mere Mehboob (1992)
Kichhhu Sanlap Kichhu Pralap (1989)
Inth Ka Jawab Patthar (2002)
Shondhey Namar Agey
Adorini (2004)
Aa Dekhen Zara (guest role as Dada Ji of Neil Nitin Mukesh) (2009)

Awards and honors
 Indian Personality of the year at 51st International Film Festival of India (IFFI)
 Lifetime Achievement award at 5th Dehradun International Film Festival   (DIFF) in 2019
 Guest of Honour 24th Kolkata International Film Festival (KIFF)
 On 88th birthday of Mohammed Rafi, Chatterjee received Mohammed Rafi Award in Mumbai.
 In 1963, Biswajit received President Gold Medal for film Dada Thakur from President Sarvepalli Radhakrishnan.

References 

Biswajit:44 Saal Baad - Devinder Bir Kaur's interview for The Tribune, Chandigarh

External links

Male actors from Kolkata
Bengali male actors
Indian male film actors
Male actors in Hindi cinema
Living people
Male actors from Mumbai
Candidates in the 2014 Indian general election
1936 births
Trinamool Congress politicians from West Bengal
20th-century Indian male actors